Archaeosine synthase (ArcS, TgtA2, MJ1022 (gene), glutamine:preQ0-tRNA amidinotransferase) is an enzyme with systematic name L-glutamine:7-cyano-7-carbaguanine aminotransferase. This enzyme catalyses the following chemical reaction

 L-glutamine + 7-cyano-7-carbaguanine15 in tRNA + H2O  L-glutamate + archaeine15 in tRNA

In Euryarchaeota the reaction is catalysed by ArcS.

References

External links 
 

EC 2.6.1